Hop, occasionally written HOP, is an abbreviation for Hsp70-Hsp90 Organizing Protein.  It functions as a co-chaperone which reversibly links together the protein chaperones Hsp70 and Hsp90.

Hop belongs to the large group of co-chaperones, which regulate and assist the major chaperones (mainly heat shock proteins). It is one of the best studied co-chaperones of the Hsp70/Hsp90-complex. It was first discovered in yeast and homologues were identified in human, mouse, rat, insects, plants, parasites, and virus. The family of these proteins is referred to as STI1 (stress inducible protein) and can be divided into yeast, plant, and animal STI1 (Hop).

Synonyms

Gene 
The gene for human Hop is located on chromosome 11q13.1 and consists of 14 exons.

Structure 

STI proteins are characterized by some structural features: All homologues have nine tetratricopeptide repeat (TPR) motifs, that are clustered into domains of three TPRs. The TPR motif is a very common structural feature used by many proteins and provides the ability of directing protein-protein interactions. Crystallographic structural information is available for the N-terminal TPR1 and the central TPR2A domains in complex with Hsp90 resp. Hsp70 ligand peptides.

The Hsp70-Hsp90 Organizing Protein (Hop, STIP1 in humans) is the co-chaperone responsible for the transfer of client proteins between Hsp70 and Hsp90. Hop is evolutionarily conserved in Eukaryotes and is found in both the nucleus and cytoplasm. Drosophila Hop is a monomeric protein that consists of three tetratricopeptide repeat domain regions (TPR1, TPR2A, TPR2B), one aspartic acid-proline repeat domain (DP). The TPR domains interact with the c-terminals of Hsp90 and Hsp70, with TPR1 and TPR2B binding to Hsp70 and TPR2A binding preferentially to Hsp90. The intermediate structures of heat shock machinery are difficult to characterize completely because of the transient and fast paced nature of chaperone function.

Function 

The main function of Hop is to link Hsp70 and Hsp90 together. But recent investigations indicate that it also modulates the chaperone activities of the linked proteins and possibly interacts with other chaperones and proteins. Apart from its role in the Hsp70/Hsp90 "chaperone machine" it seems to participate in other protein complexes too (for example in the signal transduction complex EcR/USP and in the Hepatitis B virus reverse transcriptase complex, which enables the viral replication). It acts as a receptor for prion proteins too. Hop is located in diverse cellular regions and also moves between the cytoplasm and the nucleus.

In Drosophila RNA interference pathways, Hop has been shown to be an integral part of the pre-RISC complex for siRNAs. In the Drosophila Piwi-interacting RNA pathway, the RNA interference pathway responsible for the repression of transposable elements (transposons), Hop has been shown to interact with Piwi, and in the absence of Hop, transposons are derepressed, leading to severe genomic instability and infertility.

Interactions 

Human Hop (STIP1) has been shown to interact with PRNP and Heat shock protein 90kDa alpha (cytosolic), member A1.

References

Further reading 

 
 
 
 
 
 
 
 
 
 
 
 
 
 
 
 
 
 

Co-chaperones